Ivan Obradović (born 25 July 1988) is a Serbian retired professional footballer who played as a left-back.

At international level, Obradović represented Serbia at the 2010 FIFA World Cup.

Club career
Obradović came through the youth system at Partizan, making his senior debuts with their affiliated side Teleoptik in 2006. He was promoted to Partizan first team squad under manager Miroslav Đukić, making his debut in a 1–0 home league win over Vojvodina on 22 April 2007. Until the end of the 2006–07 season, Obradović recorded four more appearances. He subsequently signed his first professional contract with Partizan, on 7 June 2007, penning a five-year deal. In the following two seasons, Obradović established himself as a first team regular and helped Partizan win two domestic doubles. He made a total of 55 league appearances for the club, scoring his only goal against Javor Ivanjica on 23 August 2009, the game ended 1–1.

On 24 August 2009, Obradović was officially transferred to Spanish club Zaragoza for an undisclosed fee. He was still allowed to play for Partizan the following Thursday, against Slovak side MŠK Žilina in the UEFA Europa League play-off round. During his four years at La Romareda, Obradović struggled with knee injuries that caused him to miss numerous games. He ultimately managed to collect a total of 48 appearances in all competitions. In August 2013, one year before expiration of his contract, Obradović was released by mutual consent.

After leaving Zaragoza, Obradović returned to Serbia and trained with top flight club Rad. He also spent some time on trial at Dutch club Vitesse in early 2014, but failed to get a contract. In March 2014, Obradović eventually signed for Belgian side Mechelen until the end of the season, with an option for another one.

After his consistent performances with Mechelen, Obradović secured a move to Anderlecht in June 2015. He helped the team win the league in the 2016–17 season.

On 11 July 2019, he joined Polish club Legia Warsaw. However, he has not played a single match in the first team. In January 2020, he was transferred to their reserves. As a Legia II player, he represented the club in the 1/8 finals of the Polish Cup, where his team lost 0–2 against Piast Gliwice. On 26 June 2020, the contract with Obradović was terminated by mutual agreement.

International career
Internationally, Obradović was capped for Serbia at under-19 and under-21 level. He was selected by Slobodan Krčmarević to represent his country at the 2009 UEFA European Under-21 Championship.

Obradović made his senior debut for Serbia on 6 September 2008, playing the full 90 minutes in a 2–0 home win over the Faroe Islands at the start of the World Cup 2010 qualifying phase. He scored his first international goal in a 3–1 win away at Austria on 15 October 2008. 

In June 2010, he was selected in Serbia's squad for the 2010 FIFA World Cup,  where he appeared in group stage match against Australia.

Career statistics

Club

International

Scores and results list Serbia's goal tally first, score column indicates score after each Obradović goal.

Honours
Partizan
 Serbian SuperLiga: 2007–08, 2008–09
 Serbian Cup: 2007–08, 2008–09

Anderlecht
 Belgian First Division A: 2016–17
 Belgian Super Cup: 2017

Individual
 Serbian SuperLiga Team of the Season: 2008–09

References

External links
 
 
 
 
 
 
 

1988 births
Living people
People from Obrenovac
Serbian footballers
Association football defenders
Serbia international footballers
Serbia under-21 international footballers
2010 FIFA World Cup players
Serbian SuperLiga players
Belgian Pro League players
La Liga players
FK Partizan players
FK Teleoptik players
K.V. Mechelen players
Real Zaragoza players
R.S.C. Anderlecht players
Legia Warsaw players
Legia Warsaw II players
Serbia youth international footballers
Serbian expatriate footballers
Serbian expatriate sportspeople in Belgium
Expatriate footballers in Belgium
Serbian expatriate sportspeople in Spain
Expatriate footballers in Spain
Serbian expatriate sportspeople in Poland
Expatriate footballers in Poland